During the 2001–02 English football season, Wimbledon F.C. competed in the Football League First Division. It was their second consecutive season at this level.

Season summary
Wimbledon's form dipped slightly from the previous season and the Dons finished in 9th place, one place lower than the previous season. This was not considered good enough and led to the sacking of manager Terry Burton after two years. He was replaced by goalkeeping coach Stuart Murdoch.

Meanwhile, behind the scenes, Wimbledon, already one of the smallest clubs in the division financially in spite of having been a Premiership club for the previous fifteen seasons, had fallen on hard times. In August 2001 the club announced its intention to move to Milton Keynes; the move was approved by the FA in April. Many Wimbledon fans, disgusted by this decision, created their own football club in response, AFC Wimbledon.

Final league table

Results
Wimbledon's score comes first

Legend

Nationwide League Division One

FA Cup

League Cup

Kit
German company Puma remained Wimbledon's kit manufacturers.

Players

First-team squad

Left club during season

Appearances and goals
Source:
Numbers in parentheses denote appearances as substitute.
Players with names struck through and marked  left the club during the playing season.
Players with names in italics and marked * were on loan from another club for the whole of their season with Wimbledon.
Players listed with no appearances have been in the matchday squad but only as unused substitutes.
Key to positions: GK – Goalkeeper; DF – Defender; MF – Midfielder; FW – Forward

References

Notes

External links
 Wimbledon squad numbers for 2001–02 season
 Historical Wimbledon F.C. kits

Wimbledon F.C. seasons
Wimbledon